Our Lady of Dolours Basilica alias Puthenpally (Malayalam: പുത്തൻപള്ളി, meaning: New Church) is a minor basilica of the Syro-Malabar Catholic Church in Thrissur City in Kerala, India. The tallest church in India and the third tallest in Asia, it is famous for its Gothic style architecture. It is the largest church in Kerala and its exuberant interior decorations include fine specimens of murals, icons and statues of saints, and scenes from the Scriptures.

History
The parish and original church building were established in 1814. It was Thrissur's first Christian church inside the fort gates (Saint Antony's Syro-Malabar Church, Ollur est. AD 1718, is the first Christian church in the Thrissur Municipal Corporation). It was a center for the St. Thomas Christians in the area (now the Syro-Malabar Catholic Church) for decades. In 1874, the Chaldean Catholic bishop Elias Mellus arrived in India by the request of the Syro-Malabar Christians and convinced a large part of the Christian community to accept him as their bishop. The group that followed Mellus was based at this church and eventually separated from the Catholic hierarchy, forming what is now known as the Chaldean Syrian Church. In response the Syro-Malabar Catholics constructed a new building in 1929. The original church was renamed the Mart Mariam Big Church, and is now the cathedral of the Chaldean Syrian Church. The current building is known as Puthanpally (New Church) for this reason. 

The construction of this church, the biggest church in India was done in different phases, starting from the year 1929. The two front towers are of  height each and the central tower of  height makes this church the 3rd tallest in Asia. Completion of the towers was an architectural challenge. A few experts from Tamil Nadu were brought over. The architect who completed the church was Ambrose Gounder.

Mass timings

Ordinary days : 6.00 am, 7.30 am, 5.30 pm

Friday : 6.00 am, 7.30 am, 10.00 am, 5.30 pm, 7.30 pm

Sunday : 6.00 am, 7.30 am, 9.30 am, 5.30 pm, 7.30 pm

References

External links
Official website

Our Lady of Dolours, Thrissur
Churches in Thrissur
Gothic Revival church buildings in India
Tourist attractions in Thrissur
1814 establishments in British India
Syro-Malabar Catholic church buildings
Churches completed in 1929